Fútbol Sala Zamora is a futsal club based in Zamora, city of the province of Zamora in the autonomous community of Castile and León.

The club was founded in 2001 and her stadium is Pabellón Polideportivo Ángel Nieto with 2,200 seaters.

Club sponsors are Euronics, Fisiolife and Moralejo Selección.

Season to season

1 season in Primera División
7 seasons in Segunda División
7 seasons in Segunda División B

External links
F.S. Zamora Official Website
LPR Fan forum
Frente Viriato Supporters
Blog about the club and its players

Sport in Zamora, Spain
Futsal clubs in Castile and León
Futsal clubs established in 2001
2001 establishments in Spain